The National Identity Card (Portuguese: Cartão Nacional de Identificação) or CNI is an identity card issued by the Cape Verdean government to its citizens.

Appearance
The card is of similar size and appearance to a credit card. It contains a variety of information about the citizen.

Information provided 

The front of the card
 Surname(s)
 Given Name(s)
 Sex
 Height
 Nationality
 Date of birth
 Civil Identification Number
 Expiry Date
 Card holder's facial photo
 Card holder's Signature

The back of the card
 Filiation
 Machine-readable zone (MRZ) as Machine readable passport

On the chip
 Same data as previous defined (except facial photo)
 Facial photo in JPEG2000 format
 Two Digital finger print 
 Digital certificates (card's authentication and electronic signature) 2048bits RSA 
 And other information (the system is  expandable)

Civil Identification Number 
Each Civil Identification Number is a 13 digit number defined as YYYYMMDDSAAAC, which deciphers as follows:

See also
 List of national identity card policies by country
 Machine-readable passport
 Bilhete de Identidade de Portugal
 Portugal Citizen Card

References

External links
 Porton di nos Ilha page for request CNI
 Registos Notariados e Identificação(RNI) page about the CNI (in Portuguese)
 Sistema Nacional de Identificação e Autenticação Civil (SNIAC) page about the CNI(in Portuguese)
 Imprensa Nacional de Cabo Verde (INCV) (in Portuguese)

 Government of Cape Verde
Cape Verde